Rio Okano (岡野 里音 Okano Rio, born on March 5, 1991, in Kobe, Japan), also known as Rionos, is a Japanese singer, songwriter, music producer, and voice actress. She has provided the music for anime, video games and other singers. The name "Rionos" is derived from the nickname "Rio no Suke" that her friend called her.

Biography 
Rionos was born into a musical family. Her mother was a classical marimba player and her father was a jazz drummer. She grew up learning piano and violin. As a high school student, she gave up trying to become a classical player and often spent time at home because of her physical condition. She was inspired by movies, anime and game music, and she began to think about becoming a composer who could work at home.

She entered Osaka University of Arts in 2009 as a correspondence student. Her condition improved, so she attended computer music school Dee in Osaka in the autumn of 2009. In 2011, she was no longer a correspondence student at Osaka University of Arts from third year.

She earned a reputation singing songs at Dee, so she sent her songs to record companies. Her songs caught Keitaro Kamo's ear, while he was director of EMI Music Japan. She released her first mini album read me (initially only for download sales. It was released on CD in 2013.）

After that, she provided songs for Yufu Terashima produced by Keitaro Kamo. In 2016, Lantis's producer Junnosuke Sato listened to her songs for Yufu and contacted her. She offered a demo of the theme song of Children of the Whales anime. She made her major debut from Lantis in 2017 in the anime's ending theme "Hashitairo". In the Märchen Mädchen anime of the following year, she composed background music in addition to ending theme.

Personality 
Rionos likes the song with story like movie's background music. She is good at composing from lyrics and stories.

She claimed that her nickname was to express a little Greek-ish and mysterious feeling.

She is a big fan of Akino Arai, whom she used first as a model. After the release of read me., she became friends with Akino Arai and the arranger Hisaaki Hogari.

She also likes the composers Ryuichi Sakamoto, Joe Hisaishi, and Yoko Kanno.

Singer Ryo Irei is a friend and has been given songs she composed several times. He participated on the chorus of a song "Sora wo Tobitai to", released with "Hashitairo".

Discography

Singles 
 ハシタイロ / Hashitairo (Released on October 25, 2017) LACM-14662
 ハシタイロ / Hashitairo - Children of the Whales anime's ending theme
 空を飛びたいと / Sora wo Tobitai to
 ハシタイロ / Hashitairo (Instrumental)
 空を飛びたいと / Sora wo Tobitai to (Instrumental)
 百年のメラム / Hundred years' melammu (Released on November 21, 2018) LACM-14817
 百年のメラム / Hundred years' melammu
 Hundred years' melammu ~First song ki-en-gi~ - Ulysses: Jeanne d'Arc and the Alchemist Knight anime's Episode 2 ending theme
 Hundred years' melammu ~Second song Enki~ - Episode 3 ending theme (Arrangement by yuxuki waga (fhána))
 Hundred years' melammu ~Third song Enlil~ - Episode 4 ending theme (Arrangement by Katsutoshi Kitagawa (ROUND TABLE))
 Hundred years' melammu ~Fourth song Inanna~ - Episode 5 ending theme (Arrangement by Hisaaki Hogari)
 Hundred years' melammu ~Fifth song Inanna (continued)~ - Episode 6 ending theme (Arrangement by Hajime Kikuchi (eufonius))
 Hundred years' melammu ~Sixth song é-temen collapse~ - Episode 7 ending theme (Arrangement by Hiroki Kikuta)
 Hundred years' melammu ~Seventh song Ziusudra~ - Episode 8 ending theme
 Hundred years' melammu ~Eighth song Paradise collapse~ - Episode 9 ending theme
 Hundred years' melammu (Instrumental)

Independent albums 
 read me. (CD was released on May 15, 2013)
 epistora
 karakuri
 tear report
 Super Moon
 europa
 hasen

Anime soundtracks 
 TV Anime Märchen Mädchen Original soundtracks "MärMäd Musik" (Released on March 28, 2018) LACA-15716
 OVA Kase-san and Morning Glories Original soundtracks (Released on June 6, 2018) PCCG-01671
 OVA Fragtime Original soundtracks (Released on November 20, 2019) PCCG-01839

Other anime themes 
 Miss Kobayashi's Dragon Maid anime's ending theme by Yūki Kuwahara, Maria Naganawa, Minami Takahashi, and Yūki Takada
 イシュカン・コミュニケーション / Ishukan Communication (Arrangement in 2017)
 Just Because! anime's opening theme by Nagi Yanagi
 over and over (String arrangement in 2017)
 Märchen Mädchen anime's ending theme by Reina Ueda
 sleepland (Lyrics/Compose/Arrangement in 2018)
 Märchen Mädchen anime's image song by Reina Ueda
 誰もわたしを知らない世界へ / Dare mo Watashi wo Shiranai Sekai e (Lyrics/Compose/Arrangement in 2018)
 Maquia: When the Promised Flower Blooms movie's theme
 ウィアートル / Viātor (Compose/Arrangement/Vocal in 2018)
 Hanebad! anime's opening theme by YURiKA
 ふたりの羽根 / Futari no Hane (String arrangement in 2018)
 Angels of Death anime's ending theme by Haruka Chisuga
 Pray (Chorus/Piano in 2018)

Game themes 
 D4：Dark Dreams Don’t Die game's background music (Music co-produce in 2014)
 Fortune Tellers Academy mobile game's background music (Music produce in 2016)
 Kumapara mobile game's theme
 ハチミツ味のしあわせ / Hachimitsu Aji no Shiawase (Lyrics/Vocal in 2016)
 Shōmetsu Toshi mobile game's theme
 Sign (Vocal in 2016)
 Reach for the Sunlight (Vocal in 2018)
 Summer Pockets game's grand ending theme
 ポケットをふくらませて / Pocket o Fukuramasete (Vocal in 2018)
 Alice Closet game's theme
 ハルニレの丘で美しい約束を / Harunire no Oka de Utsukushii Yakusoku o (Lyrics/Compose/Arrangement/Vocal in 2019)
 Machimusu Earth Defense Live mobile game
 Theme song "City Girl" (Compose/Arrangement in 2019)
 Background music produce
 Role of Reykjavík's voice
 Indivisible game's opening (Vocal in 2019)
 Onmyoji: The Card Game (阴阳师：百闻牌) promotional video's theme
 Lost Flowers (Lyrics/Compose/Arrangement/Vocal in 2020)
 Takt Op. Unmei wa Akaki Senritsu no Machi o game's theme
 SYMPHONIA (Lyrics/Compose/Arrangement in 2021)
 Heaven Burns Red game's ending theme
 After You Sleep (Vocal in 2022)
 Stella of The End game's insert song
 終の祈り / Owari no Inori (Lyrics/Compose/Arrangement/Vocal in 2022)

References

External links 
 

Anime musicians
Anime composers
Japanese women singer-songwriters
Japanese singer-songwriters
Lantis (company) artists
1991 births
21st-century Japanese singers
Living people
21st-century Japanese women singers